Barry Shabaka Henley (born Barry Joseph Henley; September 15, 1954) is an American character actor. Henley has appeared as a regular in a number of television series, has numerous film credits, and is a fixture in films by director Michael Mann, having worked with the director five times. Since 2019, he has co-starred in the CBS sitcom Bob Hearts Abishola.

His stage name, Shabaka, is taken from a Pharaoh from Egypt's 25th dynasty, who ruled from 721 to 707 BC.

Early life
Henley was born in New Orleans, Louisiana. His mother was a dance teacher, and he often tagged along to watch recitals. During his childhood his family moved to San Francisco, and he attended the San Francisco Polytechnic High School, where he was taught by Johnny Land. Henley's first true audition came at age 17 when he heard that the Encore Theatre was looking for a certain type. He was given the script but did not think he was a good fit for the part and determined not to read it. But, Henley has said, "On the bus from 45th and Quintara to Mason and Geary, it hit me...You know what, I guess this guy wants me to memorize this stuff. So I memorized it on the bus." He spent the next several years acting on stage before moving to the screen. His early stage work included appearances with the San Francisco Mime Troupe, and a performance as "Factwino."

Career
Henley made his first appearance at the age of 37 in the unsold television pilot Clippers.

In Ali, Henley played Herbert Muhammad. In Collateral, he portrayed a sensitive jazz musician living on borrowed time. He played Buddy in the 1998 film How Stella Got Her Groove Back and Pokerface in the 1999 film Life. In 2004 he appeared in Steven Spielberg's The Terminal, playing an airport U.S. Customs Officer. He portrayed Crockett and Tubbs' boss Lieutenant Martin Castillo in the movie version of Miami Vice in 2006. He also appeared in the 2016 film Paterson.

Henley appeared in the television series Robbery Homicide Division and Barbershop. From 2009 to 2010 he played FBI Agent Vreede in the television series FlashForward. In 2010 Henley played Dr. Olson in the season 3 Lie to Me episode "Veronica". In 2011 he appeared as the murderer in the Body of Proof episode "Letting Go" and in 2012 he reunited with Michael Mann for the TV series Luck, playing a parole officer. In 2015 he played a police detective in the Breaking Bad spin-off series Better Call Saul.

In 2019, Henley joined the cast of Agents of S.H.I.E.L.D., part of the Marvel Cinematic Universe franchise.

Henley is a regular cast member on the CBS TV sitcom Bob Hearts Abishola (2019–present), appearing as Abishola's Uncle Tunde.

As a stage actor, Henley's honors include the Drama Desk, Obie, and Olivier Awards. He was also a member of the West Coast Black Repertory Theatre and the San Francisco Mime Troupe.

Filmography

References

External links

1954 births
African-American male actors
American male film actors
American male stage actors
American male television actors
Living people
Male actors from New Orleans
20th-century American male actors
21st-century American male actors
Drama Desk Award winners
Obie Award recipients
Laurence Olivier Award winners